Roderick O'Donnell is an architectural historian currently working as a freelance writer, lecturer and adviser. O'Donnell is an expert on the works of the English architect, Augustus Pugin  (1812-1852) and has published extensively on this subject.

Education and working life 
O'Donnell attained Master of Arts and Ph.D degrees from the University of Cambridge.

From 1975 to 1978 O'Donnell worked as a research assistant in Dublin for the 'Buildings of Ireland' series, edited by Nikolaus Pevsner. From 1982 O'Donnell worked first as an Inspector and then Inspector of Ancient Monuments at English Heritage and the public bodies that preceded it until 2011.

Since 2011 O'Donnell has worked as an architectural historian in a private capacity. He has written extensively in academic journals and contributed articles to The Catholic Herald during this period. As well as giving lectures, for example, at the University of Malta in 2014, he has more recently given talks on the history, art and architecture of ecclesiastical buildings at Buckfast Abbey and English catholic cathedrals at the Brompton Oratory.

Photographs attributed to O'Donnell are to be found in the Conway Library at the Courtauld Institute of Art. The Conway Library collection comprises film and glass negatives as well as prints of predominantly architectural images. It is currently being digitised as part of the Courtauld Connects project.

Awards and recognition 
O'Donnell was elected a Fellow of the Society of Antiquaries of London in 1999.

Publications

Selected books as author and contributor 

 The True Principles of Pointed or Christian Architecture and an Apology for the Revival of Christian Architecture, A.W. Pugin with an Introduction by Roderick O'Donnell, Gracewing Publishing, 2003: British Library General Reference Section YC.2004.a.1318
 The Present State of Ecclesiastical Architecture in England and some Remarks Relative to Architecture and Decoration, A.W. Pugin with an Introduction by Roderick O' Donnell, Gracewing Publishing, 2004. British Library General Reference Section YC.2005.a.2721
 The Pugins and the Catholic Midlands, Roderick O'Donnell, Gracewing Publishing, 2002. British Library General Reference Section YC.2003.a.1018
 Roderick O'Donnell, From Old Catholic Mansions to 'Castles in Connecticut': The Country House Practice, A.W. and E.W. Pugin in The Victorian Great House 1836-1875, in Malcolm Airs (Ed), The Victorian Great House, Oxford, Oxford University for Continuing Education, 2000. British Library General Reference Section YC.2000.b.1663
Roderick O'Donnell, Pugin as a Church Architect in Paul Atterbury and Clive Wainwright (eds) Pugin: A Gothic Passion, Yale University Press, c1994. British Library General Reference Section LB.31.b.9848
Roderick O'Donnell, The Pugins in Ireland, in Paul Atterbury (ed) A. W. N. Pugin: Master of the Gothic Revival, Yale University Press, c1995. British Library General Reference Section YC.1996.c.4

Selected articles 

 Extra Illustrations of Pugin Buildings in T.H. King's 'Les Vrais Principes'' by Roderick O''Donnell, Architectural History: Journal of the Society of Architectural Historians of Great Britain. VOL 44, ; 2001, 57-63. British Library General Reference Section, Journal ISSN: 0066-622X 
A number of scholarly articles on ecclesiastic history, art and architecture in the journals Architectural History and The Burlington Magazine.

References 

 

Alumni of the University of Cambridge
Architectural historians
Living people
Year of birth missing (living people)